The Masters Series may refer to:

 ATP World Tour Masters 1000, in tennis
 League of Legends Master Series, top level League of Legends league based in Taipei for Taiwan, Macau, and Hong Kong
 Masters Series (Magic: The Gathering)
 Masters Series (School of Visual Arts)